Xing Aihua (born February 4, 1978) is Chinese long-track speed-skater. She represented China at the 2010 Winter Olympics in the Women's 500m and 1000m.

References

Chinese female speed skaters
Olympic speed skaters of China
Speed skaters at the 2002 Winter Olympics
Speed skaters at the 2006 Winter Olympics
Speed skaters at the 2010 Winter Olympics
1978 births
Living people
Sportspeople from Jilin
Asian Games medalists in speed skating
Speed skaters at the 2003 Asian Winter Games
Speed skaters at the 2007 Asian Winter Games

Asian Games gold medalists for China
Medalists at the 2007 Asian Winter Games
20th-century Chinese women
21st-century Chinese women